Rast is a commune in Dolj County, Oltenia, Romania. It is composed of a single village, Rast.

The locality was severely affected by flooding in the April 2006 Danube floods, with more than 4,000 evacuated residents and hundreds of households destroyed.

Notes

Communes in Dolj County
Localities in Oltenia